Phlebozemia is a genus of moths belonging to the subfamily Tortricinae of the family Tortricidae. It contains only one species, Phlebozemia sandrinae, which is found in South Africa.

The larvae feed on Nerine bowdenii.

See also
List of Tortricidae genera

References

 , 1985, in Diakonoff Ulenberg & Vari, Tijdschr. Ent. 127 (1984): 226.
 , 2005, World Catalogue of Insects 5.

External links

tortricidae.com

Endemic moths of South Africa
Archipini
Monotypic moth genera
Moths described in 1985
Moths of Africa
Tortricidae genera